North Fork is an unincorporated community in Monroe County, in the U.S. state of Missouri.

History
A post office called North Fork was established in 1836, and remained in operation until 1906. The community takes its name from the nearby North Fork Salt River.

References

Unincorporated communities in Monroe County, Missouri
Unincorporated communities in Missouri